= Child marriage in Togo =

Child marriage in Togo. In 2017 in Togo, 22% of girls are married off before age 18. 6% are married before they turn 15.
